Melissa Butler is an American entrepreneur who founded the cosmetic brand The Lip Bar. She is known for her 2015 appearance on Shark Tank, where her pitch for the vegan lipstick brand was rejected by every judge.

Early life and education 
Butler was born and raised in Detroit, Michigan. She attended Cass Technical High School, and completed her bachelor's degree in business finance at Florida A&M University. She then moved to New York to work as an analyst at Barclays.

Career 
Working full-time on Wall Street, Butler did not enjoy the job and decided to start a business. She was inspired to created The Lip Bar because she was frustrated by the lack of affordable vegan lipsticks in bright colors. In 2012, she began making and selling vegan lipsticks out of her Brooklyn home and selling them as a side hustle. She made $27,000 in her first year of sales. Two years later, Butler quit her job and moved back to her hometown of Detroit to focus on The Lip Bar full-time. Between 2012 and 2015 the company earned $100,000 in revenue. The brand's lipsticks consist of bright colors and nudes, many with cocktail-themed names. The products are vegan, cruelty-free, and use natural ingredients.

In 2015, Butler appeared on Shark Tank with her friend and creative director Rosco Spears to pitch a mobile version of The Lip Bar. They were rejected by all five judges, and were referred to as "colorful cockroaches". The judges told her they did not see the colorful lipsticks as marketable. Butler stated in an interview with The Detroit News, "Honestly, they were very cruel. But it worked out in the end because we got tons of exposure."

She used LinkedIn to contact potential corporate buyers, and eventually made a connection with a buyer at Target. As of 2018, The Lip Bar is in stock at several hundred Target stores in the United States.

References

External links 
Official website

Year of birth missing (living people)
Living people
African-American businesspeople
African-American women in business
American cosmetics businesspeople
Cosmetics companies of the United States
Cass Technical High School alumni
Businesspeople from Detroit
Florida A&M University alumni
21st-century African-American people
21st-century African-American women